Live at the King's Head Inn is Avail's first live album, released on Old Glory Records in 1994 on 10" Vinyl and reissued by Jade Tree Records in 2006 as bonus tracks to the Dixie album reissue.

Track listing
"Sidewalk" (Dixie)
"Stride" (Satiate)
"Song" (Dixie)
"Observations" (Satiate)
"Predictable" (Satiate)
"Forgotten" (Satiate)
"Pinned Up "(Satiate)
(30 seconds of the crowd chanting, no song)
"Kiss Off" (Violent Femmes cover)
"Connection" (Satiate)

References

Avail albums
1993 live albums
Lookout! Records albums